Gyrothyraceae is a family of liverworts belonging to the order Jungermanniales. The family consists of only one genus: Gyrothyra.

References

Jungermanniales
Jungermanniales genera